Fasa University is an Irani public research university founded in 2006. its campus is located in Fasa approximately 150 km from Shiraz (the Fars province capital). The institution is a third-generation promising young one, with over 1200 undergraduate and graduate students and over 130 faculty and staff.
According to times impact ranking 2019, the fast university is ranked +301 in quality of education (http://www.fasau.ac.ir/en/55-latest-news/431-fasa-university)
The campus lies on the city's west side, accommodating the faculty buildings, the library, the administration, and the boys’ dormitory. Professors' and girls' housing is located in Qodosi street, for which university has provided transportation. The campus is the borderline of the city and the mountains. It operates various auxiliary research facilities, such as the research greenhouse and thirty one laboratories. Among university faculty are recipients of the Kharazmi prize, Iran inventions grand Prize, as well as many patents. Also, students are among the top 10 ranks in MS exams and the first rank in AI challenge Sharif competition.
Fasa University student athletes compete in deferent areas namely swimming for which ranked third (2016), futsal ranked first in (2018), and second (2017), in taekwondo second (2015), and karate  first (2018).

Establishment 

The first mention of a public university in Fasa can be traced to 2006. It started work in the old bureau of Agricultural affairs (jehad keshaverzi). Simultaneously the project of the current building was initiated which took 3 years to finish the building of engineering faculty. At that time, the administration building stayed intact but the faculty and residence halls moved to the new building which up to now are still actively in use and expanding.

Campus 
The university's property totals 23,750 km2 , comprising the 10500 m2 for the Main Campus in west Fasa, and the faculty members and the girls’ housing are 3 km to the east from the main campus. The main campus has 9 buildings totaling over 10500 m2.
The university continues to expand its facilities on campus. In 2017, the university opened the Basic science building, housing 22 faculty members’ rooms and 8 laboratories.

Varsity sports 
The Fasa university Futsal team has scored 1st and 2nd in regional competitions and also hosted the competitions once.  In cycling and karate, university students are members of the national teams.  The swimming team along with the taekwondo represent the university in many national competitions in third ranks.

References 

2006 establishments in Iran
Universities in Iran
Education in Fars Province